Immaculate Heart of Mary Cathedral may refer to:

Africa
Immaculate Heart of Mary Cathedral, Bo
Immaculate Heart of Mary Cathedral, Nzérékoré

India
Immaculate Heart of Mary Cathedral, Kottayam

Micronesia
Immaculate Heart of Mary Cathedral (Colonia, Yap)

United States
Cathedral of the Immaculate Heart of Mary, Las Cruces, New Mexico

See also
Immaculate Heart of Mary (disambiguation)